is the 5th single by Mayu Watanabe, released in Japan on June 10, 2015.

Release 
The single was released in four versions: Complete Limited Edition, Limited Edition A, Limited Edition B, and Regular Edition. The title track was used as the theme song for the drama "Tatakau! Shoten Girl", which featured Watanabe as one of the leads. The coupling song "Onna no Ko Nara" was used as the CM song for Avail.

The title track shows a different side of Watanabe. It is said to be a mature love song, unlike her previous singles.

She will hold 5 events to commemorate the release:
 A mini live & passing of a different version of the cover jacket to fans on June 11, 2015 and June 12, 2015
 A solo live on September 19, 2015
 An event titled "Dokkidoki Otanoshimi Kai" on September 20, 2015
 A cruising live on September 21, 2015

Included in the Complete Limited Version is a fashion book consisting of over 50 fashion styles.

Track listing

Limited Edition A

Limited Edition B

Regular Edition

Complete Limited Edition

Bonuses 
Type A, Type B, Complete Limited Edition & First-Press Regular Edition
 Premium Lottery Application Ticket
 Avail Card (1 random card out of 8 "Oshare Mayuyu" cards)

Charts

References

External links 
 Mayu Watanabe's discography
 

2015 singles
Songs with lyrics by Yasushi Akimoto
Mayu Watanabe songs
Sony Music Entertainment Japan singles
2015 songs